The following outline is provided as an overview of and topical guide to Macau:

The Macau Special Administrative Region of the People's Republic of China – one of the two special administrative regions of the People's Republic of China, the other being  Hong Kong.  Macau lies on the western side of the Pearl River Delta, bordering Guangdong province in the north and facing the South China Sea in the east and south. The territory has thriving industries such as textiles, electronics and toys, and a notable tourist industry that boasts a wide range of hotels, resorts, stadiums, restaurants and casinos.

General reference 

 Pronunciation:
 Common English country name: Macao
 Official English country name:  The Macao Special Administrative Region of the People's Republic of China
 Common endonym(s): Macau (Portuguese) and 澳門 (Chinese)
 Official endonym(s): Região Administrativa Especial de Macau da República Popular da China (Portuguese) and 中華人民共和國澳門特別行政區 (Chinese)
 Adjectival(s): Macanese 
 Demonym(s): Macanese
 Etymology: Name of Macau
 ISO country codes:  MO, MAC, 446
 ISO region codes:  See ISO 3166-2:MO
 Internet country code top-level domain:  .mo

Geography of Macau 

Geography of Macau
 Macau is a:
 City
 Special Administrative Region of the People's Republic of China
 Peninsula and two islands (one of which is both an artificial island and an airport)
 Population of Macau: 644,900 people (2016 estimate) - 161st most populous country/dependency
 Area of Macau:   (about  the size of Washington DC) - not ranked
 Atlas of Macau
 Climate of Macau: subtropical; marine with cool winters and warm summers

Location of Macau 
 Geographic coordinates: 22° 10′ 0″ N, 113° 33′ 0″ E
 Macau falls within the following regions:
 Northern Hemisphere
 Eurasia
 Asia
 Southeast Asia
 Time zone:  China Standard Time (UTC+08)
 Extreme points of Macau:
 High:  Coloane Alto 
 Low:  South China Sea 0 m

Geographic features of Macau 
 Coastline: 41 km
 Terrain: generally flat
 Macau Peninsula - the most populous and historic part of Macau; connected to the Guangdong province of mainland China
 Taipa - connected to Macau Peninsula via Amizade Bridge, Governador Nobre de Carvalho Bridge and Sai Van Bridge
 Coloane - the southernmost island of Macau
 Cotai - a strip of 5.2 km sq. reclaimed land connecting the islands of Taipa and Coloane
 Macau International Airport - artificial island (reclaimed land)

Administrative divisions of Macau 

Municipalities of Macau
 Capital of Macau: Not applicable.  As a semi-autonomous region, Macau does not have a capital, it is its own capital.
 Municipality of Macau (coterminous with Macau Peninsula)
 Our Lady of Fatima Parish
 St. Anthony Parish
 St. Lazarus Parish
 Cathedral Parish
 St. Lawrence Parish
 Municipality of the Islands
 Our Lady of Carmel Parish, coterminous with the island of Taipa
 St. Francis Xavier's Parish, coterminous with the island of Coloane

(Cotai, the reclaimed land between the islands of Taipa and Coloane, had not been assigned to any of the parishes ).

Demography of Macau 

Demographics of Macau
Total Population: 644,900 (2016 Qtr4 est.)
 Males: 305,500 (2016 Qtr4 est.) - 47.4% of total population
 Females: 339,400 (2016 Qtr4 est.) - 52.6% of total population
Population density: 21,100 pop./km2 (2015 est.) - dependency with the highest population density in the world

Government and politics of Macau 

Politics of Macau
 Form of government: as a Special administrative region of the People's Republic of China, Macau is a city-state and a multi-party limited democracy
 One country, two systems
 PRC controls the foreign affairs and defense of Macau
 Macau has its own 3-branch government, partly elected, partly appointed
 Empowered by Macau Basic Law until 2049
 Capital of Macau: Not applicable.  As a semi-autonomous city-state, Macau doesn't have a capital, it is its own capital.
 Elections in Macau
 Mainland and Macau Closer Economic Partnership Arrangement
 Political parties in Macau

Branches of the government of Macau 

Government of Macau

Executive branch of the government of Macau 

 Head of state: President of China, Xi Jinping
 Head of central government: Premier of China, Li Keqiang
 Head of Macau government: Chief Executive of Macau, Ho Iat Seng.
 Cabinet: Executive Council of Macau
  Ho Veng On — Secretary General
 Secretariat for Administration and Justice - André Cheong Weng Chon
 Secretariat for Economy and Finance - Lei Wai Nong
 Secretariat for Security - Wong Sio Chak
 Secretariat for Social Affairs and Culture - Ao Ieong U
 Secretariat for Transport and Public Works - Raimundo Arrais do Rosário

Other departments of the government of Macau 

 Commission Against Corruption - Chan Tsz King
 Commission of Audit - Ho Veng On

Legislative branch of the government of Macau 

 Parliament of Macau (unicameral): Legislative Assembly of Macau

Judicial branch of the government of Macau 

Court system of Macau
 Supreme Court of Macau

Foreign relations of Macau 

Foreign relations of Macau
 Consular missions in Macau

International organization membership 
The Macau Special Administrative Region is a member of:
International Hydrographic Organization (IHO)
International Maritime Organization (IMO) (associate)
International Monetary Fund (IMF)
International Organization for Standardization (ISO) (correspondent)
United Nations Educational, Scientific, and Cultural Organization (UNESCO) (associate)
Universal Postal Union (UPU)
World Customs Organization (WCO)
World Federation of Trade Unions (WFTU)
World Meteorological Organization (WMO)
World Tourism Organization (UNWTO) (associate)
World Trade Organization (WTO)

Law and order in Macau 

Legal system of Macau
 Macau Basic Law
 Capital punishment in Macau
 Constitution of Macau
 Human rights in Macau
 LGBT rights in Macau
 Freedom of religion in Macau
 Law enforcement in Macau

Military of Macau 

Military of Macau
 Macau does not have a military of its own, and is a protectorate of the PRC
 Defense: responsibility of the PLA of the PRC
 People's Liberation Army Macau Garrison

History of Macau 

History of Macau
 Municipal Council of Macau
 Municipalities of Macau
 Military of Macau under Portuguese rule
 Transfer of the sovereignty of Macau

Culture of Macau 

Culture of Macau
 Architecture of Macau
 Cuisine of Macau
 Events and festivals in Macau
 Gambling in Macau
 Languages of Macau
 Media of Macau
 Museums in Macau
 National symbols of Macau
 Emblem of Macau
 Flag of Macau
 National anthem of Macau
 Public holidays in Macau
 Religion in Macau
 World Heritage Sites in Macau: Historic Centre of Macau

Art in Macau 

 Music of Macau
 Television in Macau

Sports in Macau 

Sport in Macau
 Macau Grand Prix
 Macau national football team (soccer)
 Macau national rugby union team

Economy and infrastructure of Macau 

Economy of Macau – Macau's economy has grown dramatically since the opening up of its casino industry to foreign competition in 2001. With the influx of affluent Chinese tourists in the region since its handover in 1999, foreign investments in Macau has transformed the territory into one of the world's largest gaming centres.  In 2007, Macau surpassed Las Vegas to be the world's biggest gambling centre.  Tourism hence plays a big part of the city's economy, especially since the relaxation of Chinese travel restrictions. In 2015, this city of 646,800 hosted nearly 30.7 million visitors, 67% of which were from mainland China.

Gross Domestic Product (GDP) 
 Economic rank, by nominal GDP (IMF, 2016): 86th (eighty-sixth)
 GDP PPP(Purchasing Power Parity) per capita: $96,100 (2016 est.) - country comparison to the world: 3rd
 
 Buildings
 Oldest buildings and structures in Macau
 Tallest buildings in Macau
 All buildings in Macau
 Communications in Macau
 Internet in Macau
 Companies in Macau
Currency of Macau: Pataca – closely tied to the Hong Kong dollar, which is also freely accepted in the territory.
ISO 4217: MOP
 Health care in Macau
 Mining in Macau: None (it's a city)
 Tourism in Macau
 Transport in Macau
 Hong Kong-Macau Ferry Pier, Macau
 Airports in Macau
 Macau International Airport
 Roads in Macau
 Macau Light Transit System

Education in Macau 

Education in Macau

See also 

Index of Macau-related articles
List of international rankings
Outline of Asia
Outline of China
Outline of geography

References

External links 

 Business
MacauHub 

 Government
Portal of the government of Macau
Government Information Bureau
Cultural Affairs Bureau
Macau Government Tourist Office

Guides and directories
 Macau City Guide
 

 Profiles
 CIA - The World Factbook — Macau
 Library of Congress - Country Study: Macau
 Macau Yearbook
 Encyclopedia of Macau (in Chinese)

Macau
Macau
Macau